Oppegård Chapel is a chapel of the Church of Norway in Løten Municipality in Innlandet county, Norway. It is located in the village of Oppegård. It is one of the annex chapels for the Løten parish which is part of the Hamar domprosti (deanery) in the Diocese of Hamar. The white, wooden chapel was built in a long church design in 1886 using plans drawn up by the architect . The chapel seats about 70 people.

History
Oppegård chapel is located deep in the forest in southern Løten municipality, a little southeast of the large lake Rokosjøen. It is a single-storey wooden house with a choir. The building was consecrated for church use in 1886. The chapel was also used as a schoolhouse from 1886 until  1919. A divider was used to close off the choir when the rest of the building was used for school or other non-church purposes. The building was restored in 1986.

See also
List of churches in Hamar

References

Løten
Churches in Innlandet
Long churches in Norway
Wooden churches in Norway
19th-century Church of Norway church buildings
Churches completed in 1886
1886 establishments in Norway